Nicole Peyrafitte is a Pyrenean-born multidisciplinary artist based in Brooklyn, NY. Her work in painting, action painting, writing, film, video, music, and cooking draws upon her eclectic history and the experiences of shaping identity across two continents (Europe and the United States) and four languages (French, Occitan, Spanish, English). 
The search for sustainability of body & mind is her work's quest: family, art, food, nature observation, physical fitness. Focus is on deepening connections with other-than-human voices like birds, water, and elements of landscape.  Her performances often include food cooked live and served to the audience as sustenance, from whipping cream, crepes and soups, to full dinners.

Biography

Private life
Nicole Peyrafitte was born in Luchon (French Pyrenees) into the 5th generation of a family of restaurateurs and received her early cooking training from her grandfather Joseph Peyrafitte, a renowned chef. Later she perfected her skills, interning at several award-winning restaurants in France. She moved to the United States in 1987, where she developed her career as a collagist, painter, action-painter, singer, poet and filmmaker.

She lives in Bay Ridge, Brooklyn since 2007 after 15 years in Albany, New York and before that in Encinitas, California where she met her husband, poet Pierre Joris. She has two award-winning sons: colorist & producer Joseph Mastantuono and director Miles Joris-Peyrafitte.

Career
Though Nicole Peyrafitte has no formal art training —except for two painting courses in the early 90s with renown painter & close friend Dawn Clements—, she has been practicing yoga for over 20 years, bikes &  kayaks regularly —  all activities linked to her research & work.

Nicole Peyrafitte's work has been presented nationally and internationally. In New York, she has performed in venues such as The Poetry Project, Zinc Bar, Bowery Poetry Club, Borough of Manhattan Community College, The Vision Festival, Poets House and upstate at Bard College & numerous locations in and around Albany.

National venues include San Francisco State University, University of California San Diego, Berkshire Community College, the Walker Art Institute, Bard College, The Kelly Writers House at Penn University, Boise State University & Naropa University  as artist/teacher in residence.

Internationally, Birkbeck College, University of London, University of Edinburgh, Université de Bordeaux, Festival les Voix de la Méditerranée, CCA Glasgow, ENSA Limoges, Musée Soulage Rodez, Jardin des Cinq Sens et des Formes Premières, Festival Internacional de las Letras de San Luis Potosí, Encuentro Internacional de Performance en Durango, are some of the venues that have showcased her performances.

Her visual art works are part of the permanent collections of the Musée Paul Valerie Sète, Musée National d’Histoire et d’Art Luxembourg, Bibliothèque du Luxembourg, Glasgow Women's Library Museum and National Literature Centre of Luxembourg.

Performances

Karstic Actions
Since 2011, Nicole Peyrafitte has been working on an open-ended series of live performances which brings together her interests, preoccupations and multiple practices. The KARSTIC-Action Paintings explore proprioception (the sense of body position) and kinesthesia (the sense of body movement) as meeting points between painting, poetry, voice and improvised music. Following her intuition and bypassing a range of traditional inhibitions, Peyrafitte investigates the porosity of her consciousness and unconsciousness with, as tangible aim and outcome, a strong desire to reveal the immanent soul of that moment. Most often the markings are done with the feet, either in hand-stand or head-stand, and/or with mouth-sprayed charcoals or other natural pigments (hands are rarely used to mark, except for smaller formats). Each of these events is unique. Action Paintings have been showcased at the Galerie Simoncini in Luxembourg, at the Salon Zürcher in New York, and are part of the public collections of Musée Paul Valerie Sète, Musée National d’Histoire et d’Art Luxembourg, Bibliothèque du Luxembourg, Glasgow Women's Library Museum and Centre de National Literature du Luxembourg.

Selected Performances and Collaborations

 Domopoetics : Nicole Peyrafitte and her collaborator and husband Pierre Joris show and perform together a series named Domopoetics Work at Galerie Simoncini in Luxembourg. The first Domopoetic exhibition was presented in 2017 under the name "Peyrafitte/Joris Domopoetic Works". In 2021, a second exhibition named "Travaux/Actions Karstiques" took place.
 Trialogues : In 2019 Nicole Peyrafitte, Pierre Joris and Michaël Bisio formed Trialogues, an ongoing collaboration of improvised collaborative exchanges inside a set time limit between 3 protagonists unconditionally dedicated to their chosen mode of expression: Joris to his nomadic poetry in its wandering, rhizomatic explorations; Peyrafitte to her nourishing, sensual, campy and scintillating multi-layered vocal range & texts & live painting; Bisio to the extraordinary tonal beauty and intensity of the very personal musical language of his double bass. It was featured at the Vision Festival XV.
 Collaboration with Betsy Damon for her performance Listen, Respect, Revere.
 Collaboration with Anne Waldman as a special guest for Trickster Feminism 
 Collaboration with Anne Waldman in the play Artaud in the Black Lodge

Exhibitions

Selected solo exhibitions
 "Travaux/Actions Karstiques", Galerie Simoncini, Luxembourg, 2021
 "Peyrafitte/Joris Domopoetic Works", Galerie Simoncini, Luxembourg, 2017
 Orgaginal, solo art show & concert at Maison, Luchon, France, 2016
 The Bi-Continental Chowder at Firlefanz Gallery, Albany, 2007.

Selected group exhibitions
 Women and Other Wild Creatures: Matrilineal Tales, a group exhibition of women artists who draw strength from the connection with the non-human nature, involving it in their healing practices and increasingly fantastical visions of human unity with nature. The show includes artists from Ukraine (Zinaida, Rita Maikova, and Iryna Maksymova) and Kazakhstan (Aya Shalkar and Yerke Abuova), representing the gallery's DNA, as well as works by French (Nicole Peyrafitte) and American (Susan Coyne) artists working in the U.S. Curated by Nina Levent at Sapar Contemporary, New York City, June 3, 2022- August 26, 2022 (Extended). 
 Salon Zürcher "The 11 Women of Spirit, Part 1"  New-York March 2020, more details here
 “Sun of a Beach 2” group show curated by Denis Brun at OÙ & Galerie Paradis, Marseille, France, 2015
 Waltzing in Quicksand: Poets in Collage, curated by Bruce Weber at A Gathering of the Tribes, 2010
 The Mohawk–Hudson Regional Invitational at The Albany Center Gallery

Films & videos

 "Be Like Water" Karstic Action
 "Karstic Action : I de-suffice myself in confinement" for burnt video art and experimental film festival, 2020 
 Paul Celan by Pierre Joris: A Reading 
 Robert Kelly: A Celebration 
 Things Fall Where They Lie (2018). Things Fall Where They Lie premiered at Anthology Film Archive in September 2020.
 Pierre Joris Flash Interviews #1 to #6 & Colchique (2016-2017)
 Basil King: Mirage, co-directed with Miles Joris-Peyrafitte on painter, poet & Black Mountain student Basil King (2012). 
 You Lie & Anhalter Bahnhof  for “Celan/Joris 50 years of translation” (2012)

Publications

Books and Chapbooks
 Connection en Mille-Feuille (RedfoxPress, 2022)
 Carnet 2 (RedfoxPress Ireland, 2018)
 Landsc0pes (Plaine Page, 2018) 
 Book of U Poems / Le livre des Cormorans, poems by Pierre Joris and drawings by Nicole Peyrafitte (Galerie Simoncini Editions, 2017)
 Liminal Line (Editions les Venterniers, 2016)
 Bi-Valve: Vulvic Space / Vulvic Knowledge (Stockport Flats, 2013 & Plaine Page, 2016)
 Carnet (RedfoxPress Ireland, 2014)
 Ride the Line / The Calendar / Hommage à la Vénus de Lespugue, 3 chapbooks by Ta’wil Press (1997)

Magazine & Anthologies Publications
 Periodico de Poesia- Universidad Nacional Autónoma de México (Jan 2021)
 The A-LINE Journal (Nov 2020)
 Time of Poet Republic (2020)
 Le Chant de la Sirène (2020)
 Voice of Trees (2020)
 World Literature Today 2019
 Conversation in the Pyrenees 2019
 Junction Box 2019
 The Café Review 2019
 LiveMag! #15 2018
 Teste 32 2018
 Voix Vives de La Méditerranée en Méditerranée 2018
 Peinture & Poesie Musée Paul Valéry 2018
 Requiem for Gaza 2018
 Solidarity Texts —2017
 Revue GPS — 2016
 Supplement — 2016 ( Kelly Writers House)
 Folder Silhouette — 2015
 Mary Reed and ses Acolytes – Invece No. 1 2013
 Theory, A Sunday 2013
 Bombay Gin #39.2 2013 —Naropa University, Boulder, Colorado
 Aufgabe 2013 #12 Extract of Bi-Valve —Litmus Press, NYC
 Anthologie des Voix Vives: Festival de Poésie de Sète France 2013
 Jacket2 Jerome Rothenberg's: Poem & poetics blog 2013 — Extract of Bi-Valve in
 Some Stories are True That Never Happened, an anthology by Erika Lutzner 2012
 Emergency INDEX 2011 - Ugly Duckling Presse
 Pierre Joris: Cartographies of the In-Between ed. Peter Cockelberg - Litteraria Pragensia
 The Portable Boog Reader 3, an instant anthology of New York City poetry 2010 ;
 Invisible Culture: An electronic Journal for Visual Culture. Rochester University;
 Anthology des Voix de la Méditerranée Lodève 2008
 Revue du Comminges 2008: Augustus Saint-Gaudens: Grand maître de la sculpture américaine, fils de Bernard Saint-Gaudens né à Aspet en 1816 Effing Magazine #2, 2004
 The Healing Muse Journal of Literary & Visual Arts -Center for Bioethics & Humanities State University of New York Footballs No7 Art action / Montagne Froide — France

Translations
Occitan to English
 Bernat Manciet, Ode to James Dean, Mindmade Books, 2014 
 Marcella Delpastre & Bernat Manciet selections for Jacket 2, 2014 

French to English
 Cesar Vallejo, La Mort, co-translated with Pierre Joris, Wesleyan University Press, 2015 
 Nicole Brossard, "Wildly", in Theory, A Sunday, Belladonna, 2013 
 Matoub Lounes, "Kenza" & Mustapha Benfodil, "I Conned Myself on a Levantine Day" in The University of California Book of North African Literature, edited by Pierre Joris & Habib Tengour, UCP, 2012 

English to French
 Pierre Joris, The Book of U / Le livre des Cormorans, Editions Galerie Simoncini, 2017
 Jerome Rothenberg/Ian Tyson: Delight/Délices et autre Gematria Ottezec Press, 1997
 George Quasha and Charles Stein, Gary Hill: HanD HearD/Liminal Objects, Station Hill Press of Barrytown, 1997

Discography
 Bi-Valve (Plaine Page, 2015) 
 Whisk! Don't Churn! with Michael Bisio (Ta'wil Productions, 2009) 
 Sax Soup Poetry & Voice w/ Pierre Joris & Joe Giardullo (Sanctuary for Independent Media Productions, 2007) 
 The Bi-Continental Chowder (Ta'wil Productions, 2006)

Awards and honors
 Best Performance Art Venue: Times Union · Best of 2006 · The top choices in the capital region Nicole Peyrafitte's Experimental Cabaret at Tess’ Lark Tavern.
 Best Performance Artist: Times Union · Best of 2005 · The top choices in the capital region.

Reviews
 Concerning her work, poet/performer Anne Waldman has written: "Nicole Peyrafitte is a brilliant and most original performer. Her vocalizations, her songs, her gestures are provocative: both stunningly beautiful and powerfully unnerving at times. She is the chthonic goddess come to tempt you, scare you, transform you. She is in the poetic lineage of Greek tragedy, Café Voltaire antics, of dada and surrealist play but with a post-modern, hip sensibility. I am transfixed when she's on stage."
 Greg Haymes about "The Bi-Continental Chowder"

References

External links
Official website
Collectages/Recordings of Foods & A®titudes
"Domopoétique : Foyer de création", Woxx, 2021
"Pierre Joris & Nicole Peyrafitte : symbiose!", Zeitung, 2021
"Fast kindliche Freude am Schöpfergeist", Luxemburger Wort, 2021
"De Schrëftsteller Pierre Joris", RTL No ART on AIR, 2021

French performance artists
Living people
American performance artists
1960 births